Locustavidae is an extinct family of grasshoppers in the order Orthoptera. There are about 6 genera and 12 described species in Locustavidae, with fossils found in Australia, China, Kyrgyzstan, and Russia.

Genera
These six genera belong to the family Locustavidae:
 † Brevilocustavus Gorochov, 2005
 † Locustavus Sharov, 1968
 † Mesacridites Riek, 1954
 † Miolocustavus Gorochov, 2005
 † Praelocustopsis Sharov, 1968
 † Triassolocusta Tillyard, 1922

References

Caelifera
Prehistoric insect families